Dorinda Stevens (16 August 1932 – 25 October 2012) was a British television and film actress of the 1950s and 1960s.

Biography
During World War II aged ten she was evacuated to Houghton in Hampshire where she appeared in amateur dramatics to entertain the troops. She studied elocution and was teaching it by age 13. She joined the Southampton Repertory Company where she was spotted for her good looks and was booked to appear in London aged 17.

Stevens was briefly married to the actor Peter Wyngarde in the early 1950s and later married Canadian cinematographer William Michael Boultbee (1933–2005) in Nairobi in 1957 while filming for African Patrol.

Stevens retired from acting in 1965. Reviewing her final theatrical film, Night Train to Paris (1964), in which she co-starred with Leslie Nielsen, New York Times critic Howard Thompson wrote that "the most attractive thing about the whole picture is a nifty blonde named Dorinda Stevens. The woman can act, too, which is more than can be said for most of the others."

Stevens died aged 80 in 2012 in Winchester in Hampshire as a result of complications of a stroke and was cremated at Bournemouth Crematorium.

Filmography

Selected television appearances

Notes

References

External links

Dorinda Stevens at British Film Institute 
Dorinda Stevens at Aveleyman

1932 births
2012 deaths
20th-century British businesspeople
Actresses from London
English film actresses
English television actresses
Actresses from Southampton